Knema oblongifolia is a species of plant in the family Myristicaceae. It is a tree endemic to Peninsular Malaysia. It is threatened by habitat loss.

References

oblongifolia
Endemic flora of Peninsular Malaysia
Trees of Peninsular Malaysia
Conservation dependent plants
Near threatened flora of Asia
Taxonomy articles created by Polbot